Smashes, Thrashes & Hits is a compilation album by the American hard rock band Kiss. It was the fourth hits album overall but the second hits album released by the band in the United States (Killers and Chikara were not released there originally). Of the 15 songs on the album, two were new compositions, and three were released after the band's unmasking in 1983. The remaining 10 were all released during the band's years in make-up.

The two new songs on Smashes, Thrashes & Hits were "Let's Put the X in Sex" and "(You Make Me) Rock Hard," which featured a similar polished production style as 1987's Crazy Nights. They were both produced and co-written by guitarist/vocalist Paul Stanley and were accompanied by videos that received moderate airplay on MTV. Unusual for Kiss videos, Paul Stanley never plays the guitar in either video for the new songs.

Nearly all of the songs recorded by the band's original lineup were altered in one way or another, and the Axeology website has made a detailed walkthrough of the alterations, which include a different bass line, recorded by Gene Simmons in 1975, for the song "Rock and Roll All Night". "Beth" was re-recorded with lead vocals by drummer Eric Carr, who had replaced the original drummer Peter Criss in 1980. It was Carr's first lead vocal on a Kiss album. The cover art was done by Amy Guip and directed by Mitchell Kanner.

Reception

Smashes, Thrashes & Hits was certified 2× Platinum by the RIAA on February 26, 1996.

In the United States Smashes, Thrashes & Hits is the best-selling Kiss album since Nielsen SoundScan began tracking record sales in 1991 with 830,000 copies sold until March 4, 2012.

Track listing
All credits adapted from the original releases.

Personnel
Kiss
Paul Stanley – vocals, rhythm guitar; bass on "Let's Put the X in Sex", "(You Make Me) Rock Hard", "Love Gun", "Tears Are Falling" and "I Was Made for Lovin' You", drum programming (bass drum and hi-hat) on "Let's Put the X in Sex"
Gene Simmons – vocals, bass
Eric Carr – drums on "Crazy Crazy Nights", "Let's Put the X in Sex", "(You Make Me) Rock Hard", "I Love It Loud", "Reason to Live", "Lick It Up", "Heaven's on Fire" and "Tears Are Falling", vocals
Bruce Kulick − lead guitar on "Let's Put the X in Sex", "Crazy Crazy Nights", "(You Make Me) Rock Hard", "Reason to Live" and "Tears Are Falling"

Additional musicians
Peter Criss – drums on "Love Gun", "Detroit Rock City", "Deuce", "Calling Dr. Love", "Strutter", "Rock and Roll All Nite" and "Shout It Out Loud"
Ace Frehley – lead guitar on "Love Gun", "Detroit Rock City", "Deuce", "Calling Dr. Love", "Strutter", "I Was Made for Lovin' You", "Rock and Roll All Nite" and "Shout It Out Loud"
Vinnie Vincent – lead guitar on "I Love It Loud" and "Lick It Up"
Mark St. John – lead guitar on "Heaven's on Fire"
Anton Fig – drums on "I Was Made for Lovin' You"
Vini Poncia – keyboards on "I Was Made for Lovin' You"
Dick Wagner – acoustic guitar on "Beth"
Bob Ezrin – piano on "Beth"
Eddie Kramer - keyboards on "Love Gun"
Phil Ashley – keyboards on "Let's Put the X in Sex" and "(You Make Me) Rock Hard"

Charts
Album 

Singles

Certifications

References

1988 greatest hits albums
Kiss (band) compilation albums
Mercury Records compilation albums